Tu Ángel de la Guarda (Your guardian angel) is Gloria Trevi's second album, and it contained one of her signature songs and her most widely known hit, "Pelo Suelto". It also contained other hit songs such as "Tu angel de la guarda", "Ya no", "Virgen de las virgenes", and "Hoy me ire de casa". This album was very controversial different from other artists' albums such as Lucero. "Virgen de las virgenes" mocked girls who said they were virgins but had actually lost their virginity, and "¡Ya no!" went against the machismo movement of México. Following the release of the album, Gloria was working hard in promoting radio, television and print media. Trevi first traveled abroad visiting American Union countries, Puerto Rico, Argentina, Colombia, Guatemala, Venezuela, Costa Rica, and received a Gold and Platinum for high sales achieved.

This album sold around 2,800,000 copies in Mexico, which was ranked tenth of the best selling albums of all time in the country.

Track listing

Singles
"Pelo suelto"
"Tu ángel de la guarda"
"Agárrate"
"Hoy me iré de casa"

References

See also
 List of best-selling albums in Mexico

Gloria Trevi albums
1991 albums
Spanish-language albums